Clube Ferroviário de Maputo is a basketball club based in Maputo, Mozambique. The team competes in the  Mozambican League. In the Mozambican League, Maputo has won eleven national titles. Ferroviário played in the 2021 season of the Basketball Africa League (BAL).

History
The parent club found in October 1924 as Clube Ferroviário de Loruenço Marques, as the city of Maputo was named Loruenço Marques until 1976. The club was only active in football, until the basketball section was founded in the 1960s. 

In 1962, the basketball club won its first national championship. In 1975, the team won two national championship as well.

Then, it took 30 years for Ferroviário to return at the top of Mozambican basketball, as the team won its next national championship in 2005.

In December 2019, Maputo qualified for the first season of the Basketball Africa League (BAL). In the inaugural BAL season, Ferroviário finished second in Group C and as such clinched a playoff spot behind star players Álvaro Masa and Myck Kabongo. In the quarter-finals, the team narrowly lost to Rwandan hosts Patriots (71–73), and was eliminated from the tournament.

In the following years, Ferroviário would lose the national league play-offs to their arch-rivals Ferroviário da Beira.

Honours
Liga Moçambicana de Basquetebol
Winners (11): 1962, 1975, 1975a, 2005, 2006, 2007, 2008, 2011, 2016, 2017, 2018, 2019

Personnel

Current roster

Notable players

Individual awards
Mozambican League MVP
Álvaro Calvo – 2018, 2019

References

External links
Basketball Africa League presentation 
Ferroviário de Maputo at Afrobasket.com

Basketball teams in Mozambique
Clube Ferroviário de Maputo
Basketball Africa League teams
Basketball teams established in 1924
Sport in Maputo
Road to BAL teams